Arason is a surname. Notable people with the surname include:

Árni Gautur Arason (born 1975), Icelandic football goalkeeper
Guðmundur Arason (1161–1237), influential 12th and 13th century Icelandic saintly bishop
Helgi Þór Arason (born 1986), rose to popularity after competing in Idol Stjörnuleit 2, the Icelandic version of Pop Idol
Jón Arason (1484–1550), Icelandic Roman Catholic bishop and poet
Kristján Arason (born 1961), former member of Icelandic national handball team